Friedrich Ludwig Balthasar Amelung ( – ) was a Baltic German cultural historian, businessman and chess endgame composer.

Amelung was born at Võisiku manor in Governorate of Livonia of the Russian Empire (present-day Jõgeva County in Estonia). 1862–1864 he studied philosophy and chemistry at the University of Dorpat. 1864–1879 and 1885–1902 he was the director of the Rõika-Meleski mirror factory which he inherited from his father. Amelung published writings about the culture and history of Estonian localities like Viljandi, Tallinn and Põltsamaa.

Amelung was known as a chess player and a famous chess quiz's author. 1879–1885 he lived in Reval (now Tallinn) and studied the chess history of the Baltics. Between 1888 and 1908 he edited the chess magazine Baltische Schachblätter. In 1898 he established the Baltic Chess Society. Amelung published about 230 endgame studies, making him the first chess historian in the Baltic States.

He played a few games with Adolf Anderssen, Gustav Neumann, Carl Mayet, Emil Schallopp, Andreas Ascharin, Emanuel Schiffers.

He died in 1909 in Riga and is buried at the Kolga-Jaani cemetery in Estonia.

References

External links

 
 ARVES Composers biographical data.
 Lewis Stiller: Multilinear Algebra and Chess Endgames, in: Games of No Chance, 29 (1996), p. 151-192 (Amelung's contribution to endgame analysis)

1842 births
1909 deaths
People from Põltsamaa Parish
People from the Governorate of Livonia
Baltic-German people
Chess composers
Chess players from the Russian Empire
Estonian chess players
19th-century chess players
Estonian businesspeople
19th-century Estonian historians
Cultural historians
Historians of Estonia
University of Tartu alumni